Lisa Law is an American photographer and filmmaker best known, with Peter Whiterabbit for Woodstock's "Breakfast in Bed for 400,000"  muesli in Dixie cups and 1960s counterculture photographs.

Early life 
Lisa was born to Selma (née Mikels), an attorney, and Lee Bachelis, a furrier. Her two brothers are Gregory Frank and Guy.  She grew up in Burbank, California. Lisa attended John Burroughs High School in Burbank, Galileo High School in San Francisco, California, College of Marin in Marin County, California, and San Francisco City College.

Career 
In 1965, Bachelis met Tom Law, road manager for Peter, Paul and Mary. Tom Law, and his brother John Phillip Law, with a friend, Jack Simons, owned a four-story mansion, in Los Feliz, the Castle. Bachelis moved in to the mansion. 

She became a personal assistant to Frank Werber, the manager of the Kingston Trio, who gave her a Honeywell Pentax camera. She began taking pictures of the musicians in the Bay Area and Los Angeles music scenes.

After living in Yelapa, Mexico for a short time in 1966, Law chronicled the life of the flower children in Haight Ashbury. She carried her camera wherever she went, to the Human Be-In and the anti-Vietnam march in San Francisco, Monterey Pop Festival, and meetings of The Diggers. Law then joined those who migrated to the communes of New Mexico in the late Sixties and early Seventies. 
Since that time, Lisa Law has specialized in documenting the homeless of San Francisco, the El Salvadorian's resistance against military oppression, the Navajo and Hopi nations struggling to preserve their ancestral religious sites, traditions and land.

She and her former husband, Tom Law, whom she met in 1965 at a Peter Paul & Mary concert in Berkeley, CA, lived together on a farm in Truchas, New Mexico, for 12 years and had four children.

Woodstock 
During Woodstock, Lisa Law asked the festival organizers for $3,000 to buy, in New York City, rolled oats, bulgur wheat, wheat germ, dried apricots, currants, almonds, soy sauce, and honey to make muesli. Volunteers fed circa 130,000 people with Dixie cups.

Works 
Flashing on the Sixties, Squarebooks, Santa Rosa, CA, 1987
 Interviews with Icons: Flashing on the Sixties, Lumen Books, Santa Fe New Mexico,  2000
 Beneath the Diamond Sky: Haight-Ashbury  1965–1970, Barney Hoskins, Simon & Schuster Editions, 1997

Film
 Flashing on the Sixties: A tribal document by Lisa Law, Flashback Productions Ltd.  1994

CD cover photographs
 Dezeo: Jewish Music From Spain by Consuelo Luz, Wagram Music, 2000

References

External links
A Visual Journey – Photographs by Lisa Law 1965-1971 Smithsonian Institution

 

American photographers
1943 births
College of Marin alumni
Living people
City College of San Francisco alumni
Place of birth missing (living people)
American women writers
American filmmakers
American women photographers
21st-century American women